Marsillach is a surname. Notable people with the surname include:

Adolfo Marsillach (1928–2002), Spanish actor
Cristina Marsillach (born 1963), Spanish actress